Salaheddin Ahmed Farag Fakroun (Arabic: صلاح الدين أحمد فرج فكرون; born 8 February 1999), known as Salah Fakroun (Arabic: صلاح فكرون), is a Libyan professional footballer who plays as a centre-back for Libyan Premier League club Al-Nasr Benghazi and the Libya national team.

References

External links 

 
 

1999 births
Living people
People from Benghazi
Libyan footballers
Association football central defenders
Al-Nasr SC (Benghazi) players
Libyan Premier League players
Libya international footballers
2020 African Nations Championship players
Libya A' international footballers
2022 African Nations Championship players